Carmen Acedo Jorge (born 10 February 1975 in Lérida, Spain) is a retired individual rhythmic gymnast from Spain.

Biography 
Acedo trained with Rosa Menor as a junior at club Patricia. She was first selected for the Spanish junior group in 1989.
Acedo had a tough start in her first senior international competition, at the 1991 World Championships; she placed 21st in the preliminary and did not advance to the all-around finals.

In 1992, Acedo finished 10th in all-around at the European Championships.

Acedo competed at the 1992 Summer Olympics, where she finished off the podium in 4th place All-around behind teammate Carolina Pascual who won the silver medal. At the 1992 World Championships, Acedo finally won a pair of medals  taking home a silver medal for ball and a bronze for clubs. She became the Spanish National Champion in 1993. She then went to win the clubs final at the 1993 World Championships with the Spanish Team, finishing 4th place in Team.

She is married to Spanish race walker Jesús Ángel García Bragado.

References

External links

 
 
 
 

1975 births
Living people
Spanish rhythmic gymnasts
Olympic gymnasts of Spain
Gymnasts at the 1992 Summer Olympics
Medalists at the Rhythmic Gymnastics World Championships